Mokhada is a census town in Jawhar subdivision of Palghar district of Maharashtra state in Konkan division.
villages in mokhada :
1	Adoshi	
2	Amale 	
3	Ase	
4	Beriste	
5	Botoshi	
6	Brahmagaon
7	Charangaon
8	Chas
9	Dandwal	
10	Dhamani	
11	Dhamanshet
12	Dhondmaryachimet
13	Dhudgaon	
14	Dolhare	
15	Ghanval
16	Ghosali	
17	Gomghar	
18	Gonde Bk.
19	Gonde Kh.
20	Hirve
21	Jogalwadi	
22	Kaduchiwadi	
23	Kalamgaon	
24	Karegaon	
25	Karol	
26	Kashti
27	Kevanale
28	Khoch
29	Khodala
30	Kiniste	
31	Kochale	
32	Koshimshet
33	Kurlod
34	Lakshiminagar
35	Mokhada
36	Morhande
37	Nashera
38	Nilmati
39	Osarvira
40	Pachaghar
41	Palsunde
42	Pathardi
43	Pimpalgaon
44	Poshera
45	Rajivnagar
46	Sakhari	
47	Saturly	
48	Sawarde	
49	Sayade
50	Shastrinagar
51	Shirasgaon
52	Shirson	
53	Shivali	
54	Suryamal
55	Swaminagar
56	Udhale	
57	Vashind
58	Wakadpada
59	Washala

References

Cities and towns in Palghar district
Talukas in Maharashtra